A Bunny's Tale is a 1985 American made-for-television comedy-drama based on American feminist icon and journalist Gloria Steinem's experiences working as a Playboy Bunny in 1963, as described by her 1963 article "A Bunny's Tale" (published in Show magazine in two parts).

It stars Kirstie Alley as Steinem.

Plot
Engaged by a magazine to write an investigative article on publisher Hugh Hefner's nightclub chain, Ms. Steinem poses as a young girl named "Marie" and enters the Bunny training program at the New York City Playboy Club. Outfitted with phony ears, a fuzzy tail, and a revealing costume, Gloria learns the proper method of serving drinks, the "bunny dip", and how to fend off customers who ignore Hefner's "look but don't touch" policy. She also concludes that being a sex object, even a chaste one, is depressingly demeaning—an "awakening".

Cast
 Kirstie Alley as Gloria Steinem
 Cotter Smith as Ned Holcomb
 Deborah Van Valkenburgh as Pearl
 Joanna Kerns as Andrea
 Lisa Pelikan as Lee
 Delta Burke as Margie
 Mary Woronov as Miss Renfro
 Diana Scarwid as Toby
 Romy Windsor as Bobbi
 Randi Brooks as Marybeth
 Dee Dee Rescher as Hazel
 Chick Vennera as Frankie
 Stanley Kamel as Jerry
 James T. Callahan as Phil
 Katie Budge as Gwen
 Madison Mason as Luther Baines
 Lela Rochon as Charlotte
 Chanelle Lee as Sherry
 Charles Winters as Greg
 Randy Hamilton as David
 Richard Lefevre as Willie
 Keith Mills as Doctor
 Teddy Wilson as Older Club Employee (as Theodore Wilson)
 Patricia Ayame Thomson as Playboy Bunny (as Patricia Thomson)

References

External links
 
 

1985 television films
1985 films
1980s English-language films
1985 comedy-drama films
ABC network original films
American comedy-drama television films
Films scored by Paul Chihara
Films directed by Karen Arthur
1980s American films